The name Akoni has been used for two tropical cyclones in the Central Pacific Ocean. The name "Akoni" is short for Anakoni, which is Hawaiian for "Anthony".
 Tropical Storm Akoni (1982) – never threatened land. 
 Tropical Storm Akoni (2019) – weak tropical storm that did not threaten land.

Pacific hurricane set index articles